Amerila femina is a moth of the subfamily Arctiinae. It was described by Emilio Berio in 1935 and is found in Cameroon.

References

Endemic fauna of Cameroon
Moths described in 1935
Amerilini
Insects of Cameroon
Moths of Africa